Boyd High School may refer to:

 Boyd High School, Boyd, located in Boyd, Texas, USA
 McKinney Boyd High School, located in McKinney, Texas, USA